Travagliato is a comune in the province of Brescia, in Lombardy, northern Italy. It received the honorary title of city with a presidential decree on November 12, 2001. Its coat of arms shows a silver shovel on left blue, right white.

Travagliato is the birthplace of Italian football legends Franco Baresi and Giuseppe Baresi.

Transport
 Ospitaletto-Travagliato railway station

Twin towns
Travagliato is twinned with:

  Beaufort-en-Vallée, France

References

Cities and towns in Lombardy